The  is a 16.2 km long Japanese railway line from Shimo-Imaichi Station to Shin-Fujiwara Station in Nikkō, Tochigi. It is owned and operated by the private railway operator Tobu Railway.

At Shimo-Imaichi Station it connects with the Tobu Nikko Line. At Shin-Fujiwara Station it connects with the Yagan Railway Aizu Kinugawa Line. Some trains goes beyond the Aizu Kinugawa Line terminus at Aizu-Kōgen Oze-guchi Station onto the Aizu Railway Aizu Line.

The line runs surcharged, reserved-seat limited express services from and to Asakusa and Shinjuku in Tokyo.

The whole line is electrified at 1,500 V DC, but it is single tracked except for a 0.8 km double-tracked section at Kinugawa-Onsen Station.

Stations

All stations are located within Nikkō, Tochigi.

History
 1915:  was licensed to build a  gauge steam-hauled tramway. It was renamed  in the same year.
 2 January 1917: A  section from Daiya-gawa Hokugan Station to Kinugawa Nangan Station was opened. The line was extended a further  the same year.
 March 1919: Ōhara Station to Shimotaki Station section was opened.
 October 1919: Daiya Mukō Imaichi Station to Shin-Imaichi Station section was opened.
 1 January 1920: Shimotaki Station to Fujiwara Station section was open to complete the whole  line.
 6 June 1921: The company name was renamed .
 9 March 1922: The whole line was electrified at 600 V DC.
 April 1927: The corporate headquarters was relocated to the Tobu Railway headquarters in Tokyo.
 22 October 1929:  gauge operation began on all the line.
 1931: The voltage was raised to 1,500 V.
 1 May 1943: Shimotsuke Electric Railway was bought out by Tobu Railway. The line became Tobu Kinugawa Line.
 9 October 1986: Yagan Railway Aizu Kinugawa Line through service began.
 12 October 1990: Aizu Railway Aizu Line through service to Aizu Tajima Station began.
 18 March 2006: New Kinugawa services to/from  commence.

From 17 March 2012, station numbering was introduced on all Tobu lines, with Tobu Kinugawa Line stations adopting the prefix "TN" in orange.

Future developments

Steam-hauled services

A two-stall engine shed is also being constructed for the steam loco at Shimo-Imaichi.

See also
 List of railway lines in Japan

References

 
Kinugawa Line
Rail transport in Tochigi Prefecture
1067 mm gauge railways in Japan
2 ft 6 in gauge railways in Japan